Modius may refer to the following Ancient Roman units of measurement:

 Modius (unit of dry measure)
 Modius (unit of area)